Galactoside acetyltransferase (also known as Galactoside O-acetyltransferase, thiogalactoside transacetylase, β-galactoside transacetylase and GAT) is an enzyme that transfers an acetyl group from acetyl-CoA to β-galactosides, glucosides and lactosides. It is coded for by the lacA gene of the lac operon in E. coli.

Reaction 
It catalyzes the following reaction:

acetyl-CoA + beta-D-galactoside → CoA + 6-acetyl-beta-D-galactoside

The kinetics of the enzyme were delineated in 1995.

Biological role 
The enzyme's role in the classical E.coli lac operon remains unclear. However, the enzyme's cellular role may be to detoxify non-metabolizable pyranosides by acetylating them and preventing their reentry into the cell.

See also 

 Transacetylase

References

External links

Transferases
Galactosides
EC 2.3.1